Teurgoule is a rice pudding that is a speciality of Normandy. Traditionally it was popular at village festivals in Lower Normandy, and today remains a family dish. It consists of rice cooked in milk, sweetened with sugar, and is flavoured with cinnamon and sometimes nutmeg. It is baked in an earthenware terrine for several hours. Long cooking creates a thick, brown caramelised crust over the teurgoule.

The name comes from the Norman language and means twist mouth, a reference to the faces supposedly pulled by someone tasting it due to the spiciness of the dish.

Teurgoule even has a brotherhood Confrérie des gastronomes de Teurgoule et de Fallue de Normandie which is based in Houlgate and presides over the annual Teurgoule cooking competition. The presiding members wear the brotherhood's ceremonial robe which is green and orange with a cape. The brotherhood keeps the official recipe.

Alternative names for teurgoule include teurt-goule, torgoule, bourre-goule and terrinée.

References

Norman cuisine
Rice pudding
French desserts